The 1965 Australian Grand Prix was a motor race held at the Longford Circuit in Tasmania, Australia on 1 March 1965. It was open to Racing Cars complying with the Australian National Formula or the Australian 1½ Litre Formula. It was the 30th Australian Grand Prix.

The race, which had 18 starters, was the seventh and final round of the 1965 Tasman Series and round two of the 1965 Australian Drivers' Championship. It was the last Australian Grand Prix to be held at the Longford Circuit. Bruce McLaren won the race, his second and last Australian Grand Prix victory. Australian driver Rocky Tresise was killed in a second lap accident in which photographer Robin D'Abrera also died.

Classification

Notes 
Pole position: Bruce McLaren – 2'20.3 (The grid was set from lap times recorded in a ten lap qualifying race on the Saturday)
Fastest lap: Jack Brabham – 2'18.0 (117.4 mph) – New record

References

Grand Prix
Australian Grand Prix
Tasman Series
Motorsport in Tasmania
Australian Grand Prix